The Radio Bari station, broadcasting from Bari in southern Italy, with a power of 20 kW, was commissioned by the Italian national broadcasting company, EIAR, in 1932.

Radio Bari during the Fascist Regime 

By decision of the Fascist regime, in 1934 Radio Bari started to broadcast propaganda and counter-propaganda programmes, accompanied by music and political commentaries, for listeners in Arabic-speaking countries. These broadcasts, aired at regular intervals from 10.30 a.m. until 3 a.m., were received throughout the Mediterranean basin, reaching countries including Egypt, Palestine, Iraq, Syria, Lebanon, Algeria, Tunisia and Morocco, where British or French influence was at that time predominant. A few months later, the station  also began to broadcast in the Greek language. The months that followed saw a true radio war, which lasted throughout World War II, including jamming of radio signals, between the Axis and Allied radio stations.

On 8 February 1938, propaganda pamphlets advertising the station were distributed from unknown sources via employing local Arab boys on the streets of Jerusalem.  The pamphlets featured a schedule of programming for the week, as well as pro-Palestine Arab Nationalist messages quotations from American and English sources.

The Bahrain branch of the Persian Gulf Radio Listeners' Committee in 1943 discussed whether it would behoove BBC Arabic to switch its program formatting to better compete with Radio Bari and Radio Zeesen.  The committee concluded that it didn't matter because not many people listened to Radio Bari.

Radio Bari during the Resistance 

On 8 September 1943, the Bari transmitter, one of the few still operating in southern Italy, was peacefully occupied by a group of local intellectuals politically close to the philosopher Benedetto Croce together with groups of anti-fascists, republicans, democrats and activists of the Action Party. With the help of some radio technicians, they were able to transmit on 11 September  the first message of the King of Italy, Victor Emanuel III, after his departure from Rome.
Radio Bari was thus able to broadcast the first broadcast of free Italy.
Starting from 23 September 1943, the premises of Radio Bari were occupied by the Americans who immediately made it the organ of their headquarters in Algiers.
The core programme was Italia combatte (Italy fights on) in which, while complying with the directives of the Allied Command, the speakers targeted the public opinion of southern Italy with interesting features full of news and testimonies from the front, as well as on guerrilla actions, together with information for partisans and anti-fascist propaganda.
These political programmes were supported by "a lot of music for which an entire record store was seized". 
In his 2011 history of the British Special Operations Executive (SOE) in Italy in the years 1943-45, David Stafford says:

References

Further reading
Franco Monteleone, "Storia della radio e della televisione in Italia. Un secolo di costume, società e politica. Nuova edizione aggiornata", Venice, Marsilio, 2003. 
David Stafford, "Mission Accomplished: SOE and Italy 1943–45", Vintage Digital, 2011.

External links 
Prof. Vito Antonio Leuzzi, Radio Bari (ita)

World War II propaganda
Radio stations in Italy
Italy in World War II
Mass media in Bari
Defunct mass media in Italy